Thomas Sobotzik (born 16 October 1974) is a German former professional footballer who played as a midfielder. He is the managing director of Kickers Offenbach.

Playing career
Born in Gliwice, Poland, Thomas Sobotzik started his footballing career at local club Pogon Zabrze. When he was nine years old, he moved to Górnik Zabrze. In 1987 the Sobotzik family moved to Frankfurt and soon joined Eintracht Frankfurt. During his stint at VfB Stuttgart he became twice German junior champion and returned to Frankfurt in 1990. At the age of 17 he signed at professional contract. Due to a heavy knee injury he had to pause a long time in 1991.

With 20 years he finally debuted in the Bundesliga. After two seasons at FC St. Pauli a short stint at Kaiserslautern he returned both times to Eintracht. In 2001 Lothar Matthäus signed him for Rapid Wien. Via Union Berlin he came to SpVgg Unterhaching in 2004 where he captained the side in his last season at the Bavarian club.

Thomas Sobotzik appeared in 134 Bundesliga matches (19 goals) und in 110 2nd Bundesliga fixtures (17 goals).

In 2007, he moved to Norwegian side Sandefjord Fotball. In January 2008, moved to German Regionalliga team FSV Frankfurt agreeing a -year contract until summer 2009. Upon expiration of his contract he was released by FSV Frankfurt and joined lower league side 1. FC Oberstedten.

Coaching and managerial career
Sobotzik began his coaching career in 2008 as assistant coach of the U-17 team of a lower league side, 1. FC Oberstedten.

In May 2018, Sobotzik was appointed sporting director and responsible for the commercial area at Chemnitzer FC. In early September 2019, he resigned. Sobotzik later explained his resignation with following word: The last personal hostilities, insults and threats I had to experience and suffer go far beyond what is manageable. In November 2019, he was appointed managing director of the sporting area of Kickers Offenbach.

References

Living people
1974 births
People from Gliwice
Association football midfielders
German footballers
German people of Polish descent
Eintracht Frankfurt players
Eintracht Frankfurt II players
FC St. Pauli players
1. FC Kaiserslautern players
SK Rapid Wien players
1. FC Union Berlin players
SpVgg Unterhaching players
Sandefjord Fotball players
FSV Frankfurt players
Bundesliga players
2. Bundesliga players
Eliteserien players
Austrian Football Bundesliga players
German expatriate footballers
German expatriate sportspeople in Austria
Expatriate footballers in Austria
German expatriate sportspeople in Norway
Expatriate footballers in Norway